Farm Town may refer to:

Farm Town, Leicestershire, England
Farmtown, Moray, Scotland